William Wybrow (1805 – 23 January 1897) was an English cricketer who was associated with Middlesex and made his first-class debut in 1830.

References

1805 births
1897 deaths
English cricketers
English cricketers of 1826 to 1863
Middlesex cricketers